The Pontifical Congregation of the Benedictine Sisters of the Reparation of the Holy Face is a Roman Catholic order whose focus is providing Acts of Reparation to Jesus Christ.

History
In 1950, the Venerable Abbot Hildebrand Gregori formed the organization "Prayerful Sodality" which in 1977 became the Pontifical Congregation of the Benedictine Sisters of the Reparation of the Holy Face. 

This Holy Face of Jesus devotion dates back to Sister Marie of St Peter, a Carmelite nun in Tours France who in 1843 reported visions of Jesus and Mary in which she was urged to spread the devotion to the Holy Face of Jesus, in reparation for the many insults Jesus suffered in his Passion. The devotion was further spread from Tours by the efforts of the Venerable Leo Dupont (also known as the Apostle of the Holy Face) who prayed for the establishment of the devotion for 30 years, burning a lamp before a painted image of Jesus. Pope Leo XIII approved of the devotion in 1885.

On the first Friday in Lent 1936, Sister Maria Pierina de Micheli, a nun born near Milan in Italy, reported a vision in which Jesus told her: 

In his letter of  27 September 2000 to Cardinal Fiorenzo Angelini, on the occasion of the 50th anniversary of the formation of the order, Pope John Paul II described the goal of the Benedictine Sisters of the Reparation of the Holy Face as: "The unceasing effort to stand beside the endless crosses on which the Son of God continues to be crucified."

In 1997 Cardinal Fiorenzo Angelini formed the International Institute for Research on the Face of Christ in Rome in association with the Sisters of the Reparation of the Holy Face.

The congregation has houses on several continents.

See also
Acts of Reparation
Marie Martha Chambon
 Veronican Sisters of the Holy Face

References

Catholic female orders and societies
Pontifical organizations
Catholic spirituality